Brian Eric Carrigan (born 26 September 1979) is a Scottish footballer who most recently played for Sauchie Juniors in the Scottish Junior Football Association, East Region. He has previously played in both the Scottish and English football leagues.

Career

Originally signed by Alex Smith on a YTS scheme for Clyde in 1993, Carrigan moved up to the first team as a 16 year-old in 1996. Carrigan scored 18 goals in 31 league games when Clyde won the Second Division title in 1999–2000. He was also voted SPFA Second Division Player of the Year.

He earned a move to England with Stockport County that summer for six a figure transfer fee, but was sacked by the club in June 2001, after he was banned from driving for two and a half years for drink driving.

After a trial period with Dundee United, he joined Clydebank in September 2001; in January 2002 he went out on loan back to Clyde, but this was terminated in March due to his recurring drink problems. Although the player himself disputed those claims.

After a successful trial, Carrigan signed for Raith Rovers in July 2002. He then joined Hamilton Academical in May 2003, but was allowed to leave for junior side  Linlithgow Rose in the summer of 2006. During season 2006–07, the Rose won the Scottish Junior Cup with Carrigan scoring in the final and clinched the East Region title on the final day with Carrigan netting a hat-trick.

He re-joined Hamilton Accies again on 7 August 2008 
However, Carrigan left Hamilton in November of the same year, having never made an appearance for the club. He returned to Linlithgow. Carrigan's second spell at Linlithgow was a short one and he joined Alloa Athletic in January 2009 on loan until the end of the season. In the summer of 2009 he signed a permanent contract with Alloa. In January 2010 Carrigan was placed on the transfer list by Alloa. As of August 2010 Carrigan moved back to junior ranks with Bo'ness United.

On 26 September 2010 Brian Carrigan join Glenafton Athletic, and scored on his début. After being released by Glens, Carrigan went on trial with Ashfield but did not sign for the club. After an eighteen-month hiatus from the game, Carrigan joined Kilsyth Rangers in March 2013 before signing for Sauchie Juniors in the close season.

On 25 September 2013, Carrigan has ended his short stay at Sauchie Juniors after just a month.

International career 
Carrigan has represented Scotland at under-16, under-18, and under-21 youth levels. His solitary under-21 appearance was a friendly with the Netherlands in 2000.

He was called up for the Scotland Junior team for the opening match of the Quadrangular Tournament in 2007–08.

Honours 
 Clyde
 Scottish Second Division: 1999–2000

 Raith Rovers
Scottish Second Division: 2002–03

 Hamilton Academical
Scottish Second Division: Promotion 2003–04

 Linlithgow Rose 
 Scottish Junior Cup: 2006–07
 East Region Super League: 2006–07
 East Region League Cup: 2006–07, 2007–08

 Individual
 SPFA Second Division Player of the Year: 1999–2000
 SFL Young Player of the Year: 1999–2000

References

External links 
 

1979 births
Living people
Footballers from Glasgow
Scottish footballers
Association football forwards
Scottish Football League players
Clyde F.C. players
Stockport County F.C. players
Clydebank F.C. (1965) players
Raith Rovers F.C. players
Hamilton Academical F.C. players
Alloa Athletic F.C. players
Scotland under-21 international footballers
Scottish Junior Football Association players
Bo'ness United F.C. players
Glenafton Athletic F.C. players
Kilsyth Rangers F.C. players
Linlithgow Rose F.C. players
Sauchie F.C. players